Cincinnati is an unincorporated community in Ralls County, in the U.S. state of Missouri.

History
A post office called Cincinnati was established in 1835, and remained in operation until 1907. The community was named after Cincinnati, Ohio, the native home of a first settler.

References

Unincorporated communities in Ralls County, Missouri
Unincorporated communities in Missouri